Agnaptus was an ancient Greek architect mentioned by Pausanias as the builder of a stoa, or porch, in the Altis at Olympia, which was called by the Eleans the "porch of Agnaptus."  When he lived is uncertain.

References

Ancient Greek architects